The Muratorian fragment, also known as the Muratorian Canon, is a copy of perhaps the oldest known list of most of the books of the New Testament. The fragment, consisting of 85 lines, is a 7th-century Latin manuscript bound in a 7th- or 8th-century codex from the library of Columbanus's monastery at Bobbio Abbey; it contains features suggesting it is a translation from a Greek original written about 170 or as late as the 4th century. Both the degraded condition of the manuscript and the poor Latin in which it was written have made it difficult to translate. The beginning of the fragment is missing, and it ends abruptly. The fragment consists of all that remains of a section of a list of all the works that were accepted as canonical by the churches known to its original compiler. 

During the time period of early Christianity, there was no accepted "New Testament", merely books considered of greater or lesser value.  While likely not intended strictly as a canon list, the fragment is evidence of among the first attempts to systemize such a group of approved writings, at least if it indeed dates to the 2nd century.  Debates on what works should be accepted as scripture would continue.  The earliest version of the eventual consensus New Testament canon did not occur until 367, when bishop Athanasius of Alexandria in his annual Easter letter composed a list that is still recognized today as the canon of 27 books. However, it would take several more centuries of debates until agreement on Athanasius' canon had been reached within all of Christendom.

Manuscript history
The Muratorian fragment was discovered in the Ambrosian Library in Milan by Father Ludovico Antonio Muratori (1672–1750), the most famous Italian historian of his generation.  Realizing its significance and antiquity, he published it in 1740.  The manuscript was likely copied in the 7th or 8th century at Bobbio Abbey.  A few lines of the Muratorian fragment were later found preserved in some codices of Paul's Epistles at the Benedictine abbey of Monte Cassino.  These documents date from the 11th and 12th centuries, and the copied lines largely concur with the Bobbio version with minor variations.

Authorship and date

The original author of the fragment is unknown.  The text of the list itself is traditionally dated to the second half of the second century because the author refers to Pius I, bishop of Rome (140—155), as recent:
But Hermas wrote The Shepherd "most recently in our time", in the city of Rome, while bishop Pius, his brother, was occupying the chair of the church of the city of Rome. And therefore it ought indeed to be read; but it cannot be read publicly to the people in church either among the Prophets, whose number is complete, or among the Apostles, for it is after their time.

The document contains a list of books the Roman church of his era considered authoritative — a predecessor to what would become the New Testament.  A similar list concerning the Old Testament likely preceded it, but if such a section was written, it was not preserved in the fragment.  The fragment is in barbarous Latin which has probably been translated from original Greek—the language prevailing in Christian Rome until c. 200.  Bruce Metzger has advocated the traditional dating, as has Charles E. Hill.  Other scholars disagree with this dating, however.  In this rival interpretation, the fragment did not originate from Roman Christians, but rather the Greek-speaking east of the empire, and is dated to the fourth-century due to its  mention of the Apocalypse of Peter.

Contents 
The unidentified author accepts four Gospels, the last two of which are Luke and John, but the names of the first two at the beginning of the list are missing. Scholars find it highly likely that the missing two gospels are Matthew and Mark, although this remains uncertain. Also accepted by the author are the "Acts of all Apostles" and 13 of the Pauline Epistles (the Epistle to the Hebrews is not mentioned in the fragment). The author considers spurious the letters claiming to have Paul as author that are ostensibly addressed to the Laodiceans and to the Alexandrians. Of these he says they are "forged in Paul's name to [further] the heresy of Marcion."

Of the General epistles, the author accepts the Epistle of Jude and says that two epistles "bearing the name of John are counted in the catholic church".    1 Peter, 2 Peter, and James are not mentioned in the fragment. It is clear that the author assumed that the author of the Gospel of John was the same as the author of the First Epistle of John, for in the middle of discussing the Gospel of John he says "what marvel then is it that John brings forward these several things so constantly in his epistles also, saying in his own person, "What we have seen with our eyes and heard with our ears, and our hands have handled that have we written," (1 John 1:1) which is a quotation from the First Epistle of John. It is not clear whether the other epistle in question is 2 John or 3 John.  Another indication that the author identified the Gospel writer John with two epistles bearing John's name is that when he specifically addresses the epistles of John, he writes, "the Epistle of Jude indeed, and the two belonging to the above mentioned John." In other words, he thinks that these letters were written by the John whom he has already discussed, namely John the gospel writer. He gives no indication that he considers the John of the Apocalypse to be a different John from the author of the Gospel of John.  The author also includes the Book of Wisdom, "written by the friends of Solomon in his honor" [line 70] in the canon, and places the reference next to the epistles.

The fragment mentions two approved works of apocalyptic literature: the Apocalypse of John and the Apocalypse of Peter.  The Apocalypse of John would go on to be better known as "Revelation" in the modern New Testament, while the Apocalypse of Peter would eventually fall out of favor in the 4th and 5th centuries.  The author seems to think that the author of the Apocalypse of John (see debate on the authorship of Revelation) was a "predecessor" of Paul and wrote his epistles to the 7 churches first, although this dating does not match later scholarship, which believes Paul's epistles predate the Apocalypse.  The author also remarks that "some of us will not allow [the Apocalypse of Peter] to be read in church".  This hesitation with the Apocalypse of Peter would manifest in later centuries with it not being included in later canons.  As the manuscript legacy for the Apocalypse of Peter is more sparse than books that made it into the New Testament, it is difficult to know how closely the Apocalypse of Peter read by the author of the fragment matches the few surviving manuscripts of it.

Canon list

Rejected works

Notes

References

Bibliography

Further reading
 Jonathan J. Armstrong, "Victorinus of Pettau as the Author of the Canon Muratori," Vigiliae Christianae, 62,1 (2008), pp 1–34.
 Bruce, F.F. The Canon of Scripture. Downers Grove: InterVarsity Press, 1988.
 Verheyden, J., "The Canon Muratori: A Matter of dispute," Bibliotheca Ephemeridum Theologicarum Lovaniensium (2003), The Biblical Canons, ed. by J.-M. Auwers & H. J. De Jonge, p. 487–556.

External links

 Canon Muratorianus, an 1885 translation of the Muratorian fragment 
 The facsimile of the Muratorian Canon
 "The development of the canon of the New Testament": The Muratorian Canon
 Henry Wace, A Dictionary of Christian biography: Muratorian fragment
 Earlychristianwritings.com: Original and amended Latin and English translation of the Muratorian fragment.
 Muratorian Fragment in the Eerdmans Dictionary of the Bible
 C. E. Hill, "The Debate Over the Muratorian Fragment and the Development of the Canon," Westminster Theological Journal 57:2 (Fall 1995): 437–452(PDF)
 More information at Earlier Latin Manuscripts

7th-century biblical manuscripts
Development of the Christian biblical canon
Works published anonymously